The 1200 Guineas Stakes was a flat horse race in Great Britain open to thoroughbreds aged five years. It was run at Newmarket and was one of the most important races of the second half of the 18th century.

History
The 1200 Guineas was established in 1753 to be first run during Easter week of 1757. It was established by the Duke of Cumberland, 3rd Duke of Ancaster, 3rd Duke of Marlborough, 2nd Marquess of Rockingham, Marquess of Hartington, Marquess of Granby, 2nd Earl of Godolphin, 2nd Earl of Northumberland, 10th Earl of Eglinton, 3rd Duke of Richmond, 1st Earl of Gower and Thomas Duncombe. They agreed the race was to be run over the Beacon course at Newmarket and would be open to five-year-old horses and mares. They paid a 100 guineas subscription each to enter their horse and all runners would carry nine stone.

The race was initially to be run for five consecutive years from 1757, but was subsequently renewed in 1762.

Records to 1786
Leading owner (4 wins):
 1st Baron Grosvenor – Cadet (1762), Ancient Pistol (1769), Bay Halkin (1770), Pigeon (1774)

Winners to 1786

See also
 Horseracing in Great Britain
 List of British flat horse races

References

 
 
 

Flat races in Great Britain
Newmarket Racecourse
Discontinued horse races
Recurring sporting events established in 1757
1757 establishments in England
1786 disestablishments in England
Recurring sporting events disestablished in 1786